6th AFCA Awards

Best Film: 
Black Swan

The 6th Austin Film Critics Association Awards, honoring the best in filmmaking for 2010, were announced on December 22, 2010.

Top 10 Films
 Black Swan
 The Social Network
 Inception
 Toy Story 3
 The King's Speech
 True Grit
 The Fighter
 A Prophet (Un Prophète)
 Winter's Bone
 Scott Pilgrim vs. the World

Winners
 Best Film:
 Black Swan
 Best Director:
 Darren Aronofsky – Black Swan
 Best Actor:
 Colin Firth – The King's Speech
 Best Actress:
 Natalie Portman – Black Swan
 Best Supporting Actor:
 Christian Bale – The Fighter
 Best Supporting Actress:
 Hailee Steinfeld – True Grit
 Best Original Screenplay:
 Black Swan – Mark Heyman, Andres Heinz, and John McLaughlin
 Best Adapted Screenplay:
 The Social Network – Aaron Sorkin
 Best Cinematography:
 Black Swan – Matthew Libatique
 Best Original Score:
 Tron: Legacy – Daft Punk
 Best Foreign Language Film:
 A Prophet (Un prophète) • France
 Best Documentary:
 Exit Through the Gift Shop
 Best Animated Feature:
 Toy Story 3
 Best First Film:
 Gareth Edwards – Monsters
 Breakthrough Artist Award:
 Chloë Grace Moretz – Kick-Ass and Let Me In
 Austin Film Award:
 Winnebago Man – Ben Steinbauer
 Special Honorary Award:
 Friday Night Lights, for producing excellent, locally made television and contributing to the film community in Austin for the past five years.

References

External links
 IMDb page
 Official website

2010 film awards
2010
2010 in Texas